Zena Assi (1974) is a Lebanese multidisciplinary artist.

Early life and education 
Born in Lebanon in 1974, Zena Assi lives and works in London. She graduated with honors from l’Academie Libanaise des Beaux Arts (ALBA), where she received a master's degree in advertisement. She worked in Saatchi&Saatchi advertisement agency for a few years in Beirut, and taught drawing and visual communication in different universities. Since 2005, she has been producing artistic work to depict and portray the socio-cultural aspect of our contemporary urban society.

Biography 
After living and working in her birth country for 40 years, Assi moved to the UK in 2014. Her contemporary work draws inspiration from the relations and conflicts between the individual and his spatial environment, society and its surroundings. Her pieces are punctuated by strong visual references to her native Beirut and the predicament of its citizens. 
The work takes shape in installation, animation, sculpture, and mainly paintings.
Many of her pieces were repeatedly shown in different international auction houses (Christie's Dubai, Sotheby's London, and Bonhams London) and are part of various public as well as private collections.

Assi has exhibited in solo as well as collective shows across Europe, the Middle East and the United States of America including- Alwane gallery (Beirut Lebanon), Subtitled Apeal Royal College of Art (London UK), Artsawa gallery (Dubai UAE), Zoom Art Fair (Miami USA), Shubbak (London UK), Beirut Art Fair Biel (Beirut Lebanon), Abu Dhabi art fair (Abu Dhabi UAE), Espace Claude Lemand (Paris France), Cairo Biennale (Cairo Egypt), Rebirth Beirut Exhibition Center (Beirut Lebanon), The Mall galleries (London, UK), Albareh gallery (Manama-Kingdom of Bahrein), CAP Contemporary Art Platform Gallery Space (Kuwait), Art13 & Art14 London Fair (London UK), Overture Show of Contemporary Art (Miami USA), Journey through our heritage BEC Beirut Exhibition Center (Beirut Lebanon), London Art Biennale (London UK) and Venice Art Biennale (Venice Italy).

Ideas and works
Themes that are central to her vision include present-day issues related to countries in the Middle East as they battle with internal strife and civilian unrest.
The artist uses various supports and mediums to document and explore the cultural and social changes around her.

Her work replicates the tumult, angst and cacophony that everyday life in the city is fraught with. Assi's use of pallid colors, jagged angular outlines and intricate layering, imbues inanimate objects, landscapes and buildings, with the emotional burdens of their inhabitants. The artist's central concerns evolve around issues of dual identities, multiplicity, and the potential for residing in this ‘in-between’ space.

Installations 

In installation pieces like ‘Bullet points’ or ‘Beirut 1X1’, the artist collaborates with the architect Issam Barhouch to tackle local Lebanese controversial topics and try to redefine them outside normal boundaries.
The piece ‘BULLET POINTS’ is made of a mannequin bust, velvet, copper and bullets. It evolves around the pre-conceived image of the woman in the Arab world. The dress is made of shiny golden dots, conveying a glittery luxurious vision of an icon from afar, that takes a completely opposite dimension on a closer look, the golden dots being in fact a cloth made from bullets’ heads.
The work, ‘BEIRUT 1X1’, visually translates the idea of ‘coring a piece of Beirut’s soil’, taking this study sample of virtual cubic drilling, putting it on wheels and showing it to the public eye. It is an attempt to plea a case, to raise awareness about a dramatic situation: the case of a country who desperately tries to reconstruct itself while being brain drained for the last four decades.

City people 

In her ‘Portraits’ series, Zena addresses the relation and ambiguity between the city and its inhabitants, emphasizing the idea that while trying to shape our surroundings, with its regulations and requirements, we end up being shaped ourselves by the structure we’ve built, conformed to its dimensions. Her portraits are city people, with city habits and city looks. The artist uses different supports to translate portraiture.

Either in 2D paintings on canvas or 3D big scale sculptures, her characters are so immersed in that urban habitat that they start up being covered with it until they become part of it, the slogans and facades written on their skin, the infrastructure almost replacing their bones. “Assi’s roughly chiselled portraits of rakish figures –lanky young men sucking down coffee and cigarettes, despondent young women sinking stubborn chins into thin, bony hands –jostled for attention alongside her paintings of dystonic cityscapes cluttered with electrical wires, television antennae and buildings stacked precariously on top of one another”... ”She never makes preparatory sketches and begins instead by priming her canvases directly. She creates base layers with acrylic paints and then starts adding different textures, using paper, cloth, broken brushes, whatever she finds in her studio to suit her mood”

Put it in a tin 

Through the big paintings’ collection of bouquets on canvas, titled ‘PUT IT IN A TIN’, Zena addresses a contemporary universal issue of our definition of the natural environment nowadays: is the modern world still visible by its surface? What is the price for the need of today's masses for bigger, faster, larger. The large scale of the bouquets is a statement by itself, it hints the notion of mass consumerism and globalization. Aren’t we trying to domesticate the wild untamed nature? To what cost? The canvas roll is treated as a carpet, laid on the studio's floor for months and months. It witnesses footprints, dust and coffee stains. It is used as a draft of rough ideas, scribbled notes, a palette and brush cleaner. The artist then takes control of the process, by stretching the canvasses on a wooden frame, looking for forms that appear through the layers, like shadowy memories of the past, and finally outlining them to create her bouquets planted in a coffee, tea, ketchup or soup tin. Hidden among the flowers are a variety of other forms such as soldiers, emojis, birds, animals, words and numbers that reflect what is happening in our daily life. Finally, she says ‘I take this bouquet and do what my grandmother did before me, and hers before, I put it in a tin, so that the iron would sink into the soil and make the plants grow even stronger.’

City wall 

Zena Assi's latest series of paintings ‘My City Wall’, are inspired by her personal experience of moving to a new place as well as the plight of immigrants who are being forced to move due to the political and economic situations in their countries. Her mixed media works speak about the emotional, social and cultural baggage due to displacement and the cross-cultural conflicts caused by migration. They deal with the struggle of questioning our own culture when faced with a new one, of tackling issues of identity when we are rewriting our own stories based on tainted memories. ‘My city is treated as a fabric, a kaleidoscope of symbols; the Calligraphy becomes graffiti on walls, the urban tissue becomes an embroidered panel; the landscape becomes the weaving of a textile treated with my portraits as miniatures and decorative illuminations’. This series of work is an attempt to put on canvas the landscape of a constantly shifting city. The notion of a vibrant secure city haven is being exposed only to see what's beneath; it is fixed on a canvas only to witness its hollow prefabricated infrastructure. ‘In Zena Assi’s works, symbols and codes accumulate; one must look closely at the paintings to distinguish every detail of which some refer to older works. Other elements of the décor are nevertheless disturbing; the recurring presence of advertising billboards and posters for consumer products, luxury items, or big companies of the Net, emphasizes that despite of the situation, life goes on and trade resumes its rights…’

Inspired by Egon Schiele, himself a protégé of Gustav Klimt, Assi's work is about the weight and baggage of civilization on the ordinary person, and the link and dichotomy between the two. It often reflects the situation in Lebanon and addresses the issues of war, peace, silence, hope and individual frustration.

Selected exhibitions

Solo exhibitions
2017 Les Passeurs, Office du tourisme du Liban, Paris, France.
2017 Put it in a tin & City Wall, Art Sawa, Dubai, UAE.
2016 My City shore, Art Sawa, Dubai, UAE. 
2014 Framing My City, Alwane Gallery, Beirut, Lebanon. 
2013 Bug Soldiers, Art Sawa, Dubai, UAE. 
2012 Still Nature, Art Sawa, Dubai, UAE.
2011 Omissions selectives, Alwane Gallery, Beirut, Lebanon.
2010 Cityphilia, Albareh Gallery, Manama, Bahrain.
2010 Mass Movement, Art Sawa, Dubai, UAE.
2009 Public Space, Art Sawa, Dubai, UAE.
2009 Un peu de Beyrouth, Alwane Gallery, Beirut, Lebanon.
2008 Cite et citadins, Alwane Gallery, Beirut, Lebanon.

Collective exhibitions 
2017 The Venice Art Biennale, Grenada Pavilion, Venice, Italy.
2017 IWM Short Film Festival, Imperial War Museum, London, UK.
2017 I AM, Katzen Arts Center of American University, Washington, D.C., USA.
2017 I AM, National Gallery of Fine Arts, Amman, Jordan 
2017 The Lynn Painter-Stainers Prize, Guildford House Gallery, Guildford, Surrey, UK.
2017 The London Art Biennale, Chelsea Old Town, London, UK.
2017 The Lynn Painter-Stainters Prize, Mall Galleries, London, UK.
2017 The Pastel Society's 118th Annual Exhibition, Mall Galleries, London, UK.
2016 Espacio Gallery, London, UK.
2016 Portrait in April, Saatchi Gallery On Screen, London, UK.
2015 Start Auction, Paddle 8.
2014 Art14 London Fair, Olympia, Kensington, London, UK.
2013 Abu Dhabi Art Fair, Saadiyat Cultural District, Abu Dhabi, UAE.
2013 Syri-Arts Auction, Beirut Exhibition Center, Beirut, Lebanon.
2013 Art13 London Fair, Olympia, Kensington, London, UK.
2013 Pullman Art Night, Dubai, UAE.
2013 ArtNight special Edition- DIFC, Art Sawa, Dubai, UAE.
2013 Journey through our heritage, Beirut Exhibition Center, Beirut, Lebanon.
2013 Atfal Souriyah, Mark Hachem, Beirut, Lebanon.
2012 OverTure, Miami Art fair, Miami, USA.
2012 Dress Code Project, Contemporary Art Platform “CAP” Kuwait.
2012 The Lebanese Creations 1959, 2012, Espace Claude Lemand, Paris, France.
2012 XXXI salon d’Automne Musée Sursock, Beirut, Lebanon.
2011 Subtitled, Royal College of Art, London, UK.
2011 Acquired by the Barjeel Art Foundation, Sharjah, UAE.
2011 XXX Salon d’Automne Musée Sursock - Beirut – Lebanon.
2011 Shubbak, London, UK.
2011 Menasart Fair, Beirut, Lebanon.
2011 Abu Dhabi Art Fair, Abu Dhabi, UAE.
2011 Rebirth, Beirut Exhibition Center, Beirut, Lebanon.
2010 XXII Biennale of Cairo, Cairo, Egypt.
2010 Zoom, Miami, USA.
2010 Contemparabia, Dome, Beirut, Lebanon.
2009 Prize: BMW, mini cooper's 50th anniversary, ‘best design for the Middle East’
2009 Abu Dhabi Art Fair, Abu Dhabi, UAE.
2009 Prize: mention spéciale du jury XXIX salon d’automne Musée Sursock, Beirut, Lebanon.
2008 Regards d’artistes II, Alwane Gallery, Beirut, Lebanon.
2008 Creative Expressions, Art Sawa, Dubai, UAE.
2008 Art Paris Abu Dhabi art fair, Abu Dhabi, UAE.
2008 Opening, Art Sawa, Dubai, UAE.
2008 XXVIII Salon d'Automne, Musée Sursock, Lebanon.
2006 Collective Exhibition, Alwane Gallery, Beirut, Lebanon.
2006 XXVII Salon d'Automne, Musée Sursock, Lebanon.
2005 XXVI Salon d'Automne, Musée Sursock, Lebanon.

References

'les mauvaises frequentations' le blog de Thierry Savatier: 

'Al Hayat' Maya El Hage

External links
Zena Assi website

 barjeel art foundation

Living people
1974 births
Lebanese painters
Lebanese women painters
Lebanese women artists
Contemporary painters
20th-century women artists